XF4 may refer to:

Aircraft 
Douglas F4D Skyray (prototype designation XF4D-1), jet fighter-interceptor
Grumman F4F Wildcat (experimental designations XF4F-1 to XF4F-3), monoplane fighter
McDonnell Douglas F-4 Phantom II (experimental designation XF4H-1), jet fighter-bomber
Vought F4U Corsair (experimental designation XF4U-1), monoplane fighter

Other uses 
The X Factor (British series 4), British TV series
Radio callsign for the Revillagigedo islands in Mexico - see Call signs in Mexico